Fairfield is an unincorporated community in Blount County, Tennessee, United States.

Notes

Unincorporated communities in Blount County, Tennessee
Unincorporated communities in Tennessee